In commutative algebra, the Hilbert function, the Hilbert polynomial, and the Hilbert series of a graded commutative algebra finitely generated over a field are three strongly related notions which measure the growth of the dimension of the homogeneous components of the algebra.

These notions have been extended to filtered algebras, and graded or filtered modules over these algebras, as well as to coherent sheaves over projective schemes.

The typical situations where these notions are used are the following:
 The quotient by a homogeneous ideal of a  multivariate polynomial ring, graded by the total degree.
 The quotient by an ideal of a  multivariate polynomial ring, filtered by the total degree.
 The filtration of a local ring by the powers of its maximal ideal. In this case the Hilbert polynomial is called the Hilbert–Samuel polynomial.

The Hilbert series of an algebra or a module is a special case of the Hilbert–Poincaré series of a graded vector space.

The Hilbert polynomial and Hilbert series are important in computational algebraic geometry, as they are the easiest known way for computing the dimension and the degree of an algebraic variety defined by explicit polynomial equations. In addition, they provide useful invariants for families of algebraic varieties because a flat family  has the same Hilbert polynomial over any closed point . This is used in the construction of the Hilbert scheme and Quot scheme.

Definitions and main properties

Consider a finitely generated graded commutative algebra  over a field , which is finitely generated by elements of positive degree. This means that 

and that .

The Hilbert function

maps the integer  to the dimension of the -vector space . The Hilbert series, which is called Hilbert–Poincaré series in the more general setting of graded vector spaces, is the formal series

If  is generated by  homogeneous elements of positive degrees , then the sum of the Hilbert series is a rational fraction

where  is a polynomial with integer coefficients.

If  is generated by elements of degree 1 then the sum of the Hilbert series may be rewritten as

In this case the series expansion of this rational fraction is

where
 

If 

This polynomial is the Hilbert polynomial, and has the form

The Hilbert polynomial is a numerical polynomial, since the dimensions are integers, but the polynomial almost never has integer coefficients .

The Hilbert function, the Hilbert series and the Hilbert polynomial of a filtered algebra are those of the associated graded algebra.

Graded algebra and polynomial rings 

Polynomial rings and their quotients by homogeneous ideals are typical graded algebras. Conversely, if  is a graded algebra generated over the field  by  homogeneous elements  of degree 1, then the map which sends  onto  defines an homomorphism of graded rings from  onto .

Thus, the graded algebras generated by elements of degree 1 are exactly, up to an isomorphism, the quotients of polynomial rings by homogeneous ideals. Therefore, the remainder of this article will be restricted to the quotients of polynomial rings by ideals.

Properties of Hilbert series

Additivity 
Hilbert series and Hilbert polynomial are additive relatively to exact sequences. More precisely, if 

is an exact sequence of graded or filtered modules, then we have 
 
and 

This follows immediately from the same property for the dimension of vector spaces.

Quotient by a non-zero divisor 

Then we have 

It follows from the additivity on the exact sequence 

This implies that

Hilbert series and Hilbert polynomial of a polynomial ring 

The Hilbert series of the polynomial ring  in  indeterminates is 

It follows that the Hilbert polynomial is 
 

The proof that the Hilbert series has this simple form is obtained by applying recursively the previous formula for the quotient by a non zero divisor (here ) and remarking that

Shape of the Hilbert series and dimension 

A graded algebra  generated by homogeneous elements of degree 1 has Krull dimension zero if the maximal homogeneous ideal, that is the ideal generated by the homogeneous elements of degree 1, is nilpotent.

The additivity of Hilbert series shows that .

Degree of a projective variety and Bézout's theorem 

The Hilbert series allows us to compute the degree of an algebraic variety as the value at 1 of the numerator of the Hilbert series. This provides also a rather simple proof of Bézout's theorem.

For showing the relationship between the degree of a projective algebraic set and the Hilbert series, consider a projective algebraic set , defined as the set of the zeros of a homogeneous ideal , where  is a field, and let  be the ring of the regular functions on the algebraic set.

In this section, one does not need irreducibility of algebraic sets nor primality of ideals. Also, as Hilbert series are not changed by extending the field of coefficients, the field  is supposed, without loss of generality, to be algebraically closed.

The definition of a regular sequence implies the existence of exact sequences

for  This implies that 

The ring  has Krull dimension one, and is the ring of regular functions of a projective algebraic set  of dimension 0 consisting of a finite number of points, which may be multiple points. As  belongs to a regular sequence, none of these points belong to the hyperplane of equation  The complement of this hyperplane is an affine space that contains  This makes  an affine algebraic set, which has  as its ring of regular functions.

which implies that 

Here we are using Hilbert series of filtered algebras, and the fact that the Hilbert series of a graded algebra is also its Hilbert series as filtered algebra.

Thus  is an Artinian ring, which is a -vector space of dimension , and Jordan–Hölder theorem may be used for proving that  is the degree of the algebraic set . In fact, the multiplicity of a point is the number of occurrences of the corresponding maximal ideal in a composition series.

For proving Bézout's theorem, one may proceed similarly.

shows that

Looking on the numerators this proves the following generalization of Bézout's theorem:

In a more geometrical form, this may restated as:

The usual Bézout's theorem is easily deduced by starting from a hypersurface, and intersecting it with  other hypersurfaces, one after the other.

Complete intersection
A projective algebraic set is a complete intersection if its defining ideal is generated by a regular sequence. In this case, there is a simple explicit formula for the Hilbert series.

The additivity of Hilbert series implies thus 

A simple recursion gives 

Relation with free resolutions 
Every graded module  over a graded regular ring  has a graded free resolution because of the Hilbert syzygy theorem, meaning there exists an exact sequence

The additivity of Hilbert series implies that

If  is a polynomial ring, and if one knows the degrees of the basis elements of the  then the formulas of the preceding sections allow deducing  from  In fact, these formulas imply that, if a graded free module  has a basis of  homogeneous elements of degrees  then its Hilbert series is 

These formulas may be viewed as a way for computing Hilbert series. This is rarely the case, as, with the known algorithms, the computation of the Hilbert series and the computation of a free resolution start from the same Gröbner basis, from which the Hilbert series may be directly computed with a computational complexity which is not higher than that the complexity of the computation of the free resolution.

Computation of Hilbert series and Hilbert polynomial 

The Hilbert polynomial is easily deducible from the Hilbert series (see above). This section describes how the Hilbert series may be computed in the case of a quotient of a polynomial ring, filtered or graded by the total degree.

Thus let K a field,  be a polynomial ring and I be an ideal in R. Let H be the homogeneous ideal generated by the homogeneous parts of highest degree of the elements of I. If I is homogeneous, then H=I. Finally let B be a Gröbner basis of I for a monomial ordering refining the total degree partial ordering and G the (homogeneous) ideal generated by the leading monomials of the elements of B.

The computation of the Hilbert series is based on the fact that the filtered algebra R/I and the graded algebras R/H and R/G have the same Hilbert series.

Thus the computation of the Hilbert series is reduced, through the computation of a Gröbner basis, to the same problem for an ideal generated by monomials, which is usually  much easier than the computation of the Gröbner basis. The computational complexity of the whole computation depends mainly on the regularity, which is the degree of the numerator of the Hilbert series. In fact the Gröbner basis may be computed by linear algebra over the polynomials of degree bounded by the regularity.

The computation of Hilbert series and Hilbert polynomials are available in most computer algebra systems. For example in both Maple and Magma these functions are named HilbertSeries and HilbertPolynomial.

Generalization to coherent sheaves 
In algebraic geometry, graded rings generated by elements of degree 1 produce projective schemes by Proj construction while finitely generated graded modules correspond to coherent sheaves. The Euler characteristic in this case is a well-defined number by Grothendieck's finiteness theorem.

This function is indeed a polynomial. For large m it agrees with dim  by Serre's vanishing theorem. If M is a finitely generated graded module and  the associated coherent sheaf the two definitions of Hilbert polynomial agree.

Graded free resolutions
Since the category of coherent sheaves on a projective variety  is equivalent to the category of graded-modules modulo a finite number of graded-pieces, we can use the results in the previous section to construct Hilbert polynomials of coherent sheaves. For example, a complete intersection  of multi-degree  has the resolution

See also 
 Castelnuovo–Mumford regularity
 Hilbert scheme
 Quot scheme

Citations

References 

 
 .
 
 .

Commutative algebra
Algebraic geometry